Muhammad al-'Arabi al-Tabbani (1897–1970), also known as Abu Hamid ibn Marzuq was an Algerian Maliki jurist (faqih), Ash'ari theologian, Hadith scholar (muhaddith), historian (mu'arrikh), and a genealogist (nassāba), who was the Imam of the Great Mosque in Mecca in his time.

He is considered one of the most prominent hadith scholars of his era; and he is perhaps best known for his criticism of Wahhabism/Salafism, as found in his book entitled, Bara'at al-Ash'ariyyin min 'Aqa'id al-Mukhalifin.

His name 'al-Tabbani' is derived from the town and commune of Ouled Tebben.

Birth 
He was born in Ras el-Oued in 1315 AH/1897 AD.

Lineage 
His lineage reaches back to 'Abd al-Salam b. Mashish (d. 625/1228), whose lineage ends with al-Hasan b. 'Ali b. Abi Talib (d. 49/669).

Teachers 
He studied under many scholars, among them are:
 'Abd al-Hamid ibn Badis.
 Yusuf al-Nabhani.
 Muhammad Bakhit al-Muti'i.
 Muhammad ibn Ja'far al-Kattani.
 Muhammad al-Makki ibn 'Azuz.
 Hamdan ibn Ahmad al-Wanisi.
 Ahmad ibn al-Khayyat al-Zakari.
 Mushtaq Ahmad al-Hindi.

Students 
Among his celebrated students are:
 'Alawi ibn 'Abbas al-Maliki and his son Muhammad 'Alawi al-Maliki.
 'Abdullah al-Harari.
 Muhammad Nur Saif.
 Hasan al-Mashshat.
 'Abdullah b. Sa'id al-Lahji.
 Muhammad Amin Kutbi.
 'Abd al-Qadir b. Ahmad al-Jaza'iri.

Works 
Among his books are the following:
 Bara'at al-Ash'ariyyin min 'Aqa'id al-Mukhalifin. In this book, he criticized the doctrinal views advocated by Ibn Taymiyya (d. 728/1328) and his student Ibn al-Qayyim (d. 751/1350), and Muhammad ibn 'Abd al-Wahhab (d. 1207/1792) and his followers.
 Al-Ta'aqqub al-Mufid 'ala Hadyy al-Zar'i al-Shadid. In this book, he criticized Ibn al-Qayyim's book Zad al-Ma'ad.
 Tahzir al-'Abqari min Muhadarat al-Khudari. In this book, he criticized the Egyptian legal historian Muhammad al-Khudari (d. 1345/1927).

Death 
He died in 1390 AH/1970 AD in Mecca and was buried in Jannat al-Mu'alla cemetery, next to the tomb of Asma' bint Abi Bakr (d. 73/692).

See also 

 Sulayman ibn 'Abd al-Wahhab
 Ahmad Zayni Dahlan
 Muhammad Zahid al-Kawthari
 Abdullah al-Ghumari
 Khalil Ahmad Saharanpuri
 Muhammad 'Abid al-Sindi
 Muhammad Said Ramadan al-Bouti
 'Ali Gum'a
 Ahmad Karima
 Sa'id Foudah

References

External links
 Muhammad al-'Arabi al-Tabbani's page on Goodreads

1897 births
1970 deaths
People from Sétif
Asharis
20th-century Muslim theologians
Algerian Maliki scholars
Algerian Sunni Muslim scholars of Islam
Sunni imams
Arab historians
Hadith scholars
Critics of Ibn Taymiyya
Critics of Ibn al-Qayyim
Critics of Wahhabism
Muslim reformers
Burials at Jannat al-Mu'alla
Imams of the Great Mosque of Mecca